Mockingbird is a song by American recording artist Rob Thomas. It is the fourth single (third outside of Australia) from the album Cradlesong, released on April 20, 2010. The song debuted at #50 on the ARIA Charts and, in the US, debuted at 29 on the Adult Pop Songs chart and at 100 on the Billboard Hot 100, making his third song of Cradlesong to reach the Hot 100. For the chart week ending August 28, 2010, the song reached #95 on the Hot 100.

"Mockingbird" marks Thomas's ninth solo top 10 and eighth consecutive top 5 hit on the Adult Pop Songs chart, peaking at number four. Thomas's combined 21 trips to the chart's top 10 (counting the singles as lead singer of Matchbox Twenty) gives him the second best top 10 sum in the chart's history after only Goo Goo Dolls' 13.

Charts

Weekly charts

Year-end charts

References

2010 singles
Rob Thomas (musician) songs
Songs written by Rob Thomas (musician)
Song recordings produced by Matt Serletic
2009 songs
Atlantic Records singles